King School, formerly King Low Heywood Thomas, is a private, co-educational day school for pre-kindergarten through grade 12 in Stamford, Connecticut. King attracts students from 30 towns in the Fairfield County, Connecticut, Dutchess County, New York and Westchester County, New York areas.

Athletics

King is part of the Fairchester Athletic Association (FAA), consisting of independent schools in Fairfield County, CT, Westchester County, NY, and of the Western New England Preparatory School Association (WNEPSA).

Notable past King athletes include:
 Nate Collins, a defensive end/nose guard most recently with the Chicago Bears 
 Kevin Pierre-Louis, a linebacker with the Houston Texans
 Silas Redd, a running back most recently with the Washington Commanders

Fall
Boys' Football
Boys' and Girls' Soccer
Boys' and Girls' Cross country
Girls' Volleyball
Girls' Field hockey
Boys and Girls’ Crew

Winter
Boys' and Girls' Basketball
Coed Hockey
Coed Squash
Coed Swimming
Coed Crew

Spring
Boys' and Girls' Tennis
Boys' and Girls' Golf
Boys' and Girls' Lacrosse
Boys' and Girls' Track and field
Girls' Softball
Boys' Baseball

Notable alumni

Carter Burwell - (Class of 1973, King School), Primetime Emmy Winner and Academy Award Nominated composer
Joe Carstairs - (c1911-1915, Low Heywood)
Nate Collins - (Class of 2006, King Low Heywood Thomas), free agent NFL/CFL defensive end/nose guard
Dixie D'Amelio - (Class of 2020, King School), social media influencer, singer, model and actress 
Kevin Pierre-Louis - (Class of 2010, King Low Heywood Thomas), linebacker for the Houston Texans
Adam Platzner  - (Class of 1997, King Low Heywood Thomas), entrepreneur, producer, co-founder of Zig Media and Dream Water
Silas Redd - (Class of 2010, King Low Heywood Thomas), retired NFL running back for the Washington Football Team
Joy Reidenberg - (Class of 1979, Low Heywood Thomas), comparative anatomist and television personality
Alexander Soros - (Class of 2004, King Low Heywood Thomas), Non-profit executive and philanthropist
Kiran Rao - (Class of 2025, King School)

See also
Education in Stamford, Connecticut

References

Education in Stamford, Connecticut
Schools in Fairfield County, Connecticut
Educational institutions established in 1865
Private high schools in Connecticut
Private middle schools in Connecticut
Private elementary schools in Connecticut
Preparatory schools in Connecticut
1865 establishments in Connecticut